Ahmed Jahouh (born 31 July 1988) is a Moroccan professional footballer who plays as a defensive midfielder for Indian Super League club Mumbai City.

Club career 
Born in Al Aaroui, Jahouh started his career with Ittihad Khemisset.  In 2010, he joined Moghreb Tétouan. Jahouh went on to win the 2011–12 Botola and the 2013–14 Botola with Moghreb. On 28 September 2012, he joined Emirati club Al-Ittihad Kalba on a year long loan deal. In January 2013, he was released by Kalba. On 8 September 2015, he signed with Raja Casablanca and penned a three-year contract. After being used sparingly by Casablanca, he joined FUS Rabat on 25 July 2016 on a three-year contract. On 31 October, he scored his first goal for the club in a 2–2 draw against Casablanca.

On 2 August 2017, Jahouh joined Indian Super League side Goa on a season-long loan. He became the first Moroccan footballer to play in India. During the season, he refused to display a sponsor logo of an alcohol brand on match shirt citing religious reasons. Jahouh extended his stay at the club after a successful debut season on loan. In May 2019, he signed a one-year contract extension with the club. With most successful tackles and passes, Jahouh played a pivotol role in Goa's top of the league finish in the 2019–20 Indian Super League.

Mumbai City 
On 22 October 2020, Mumbai City announced that they had signed Jahouh on a two-year deal.

On 21 November, Jahouh made his debut for the club in the Indian Super League against NorthEast United, in a narrow 1–0 defeat. It was a debut to forget as was sent off with a straight red, a couple of minutes before halftime for his studs-up challenge on Khassa Camara.

He won the Indian Super League Winners Shield and the Indian Super League title in his first season with the club, completing a domestic double.

Jahouh made his first appearance of the 2021–22 Indian Super League season, on 22 November 2021, against Goa, which ended in a resounding 3–0 win. Five days later, he scored his first goal for the club, against Hyderabad, in a 3–1 defeat. He opened the scoring with a thumping right-footed finish after the Hyderabad players failed to clear their lines inside the penalty area.

On 11 February, Jahouh signed a one-year contract extension, keeping him at the club until the end of the 2022–23 season. He registered three goals along with seven assists in 15 league appearances, as the Islanders finished on fifth place and failed to qualify for the playoffs.

He was later included in the club's 2022 AFC Champions League squad. He started in the club's AFC Champions League debut match, on 8 April, against Al Shabab which ended in a 3–0 defeat. Three days later, he was part of a historic 2–1 win against Al-Quwa Al-Jawiya, as Mumbai City became the first Indian club to win a AFC Champions League game. He provided the assist for the winning goal scored by Rahul Bheke.

International career 
Jahouh has been capped at the international level, representing the team in 2012 Arab Nations Cup, where they defeated Libya in the final.

Career statistics

Club

Honours 
 FC Goa
 Indian Super League League Winners Shield: 2019–20

Mumbai City
 Indian Super League League Winners Shield: 2020–21, 2022–23
 Indian Super League: 2020–21

Morocco
 Arab Cup: 2012

References

External links 

1988 births
Living people
Moroccan footballers
Morocco international footballers
Moroccan expatriate footballers
Association football midfielders
Al-Ittihad Kalba SC players
Raja CA players
FC Goa players
Mumbai City FC players
Moghreb Tétouan players
Moroccan expatriate sportspeople in the United Arab Emirates
Expatriate footballers in the United Arab Emirates
Expatriate footballers in India
Moroccan expatriate sportspeople in India
Ittihad Khemisset players
Fath Union Sport players
Morocco A' international footballers
2016 African Nations Championship players